The real was the currency of Costa Rica until 1850 and continued to circulate until 1864. It had no subdivisions. 16 silver reales equaled 1 gold escudo. The real was replaced by the peso at a rate of 1 peso = 8 reales.

Initially, Spanish and Spanish colonial reales circulated, followed in 1824 by the Central American Republic real. In 1842, Costa Rica issued its first coins, ½ real and 1 escudo pieces. These were followed in 1847 by 1 real coins. In 1850, when the first peso coins were issued, gold coins were issued for ½, 1 and 2 escudos. The last coins denominated in reales were issued in 1850, whilst the last escudo coins were issued in 1864.

References 

Modern obsolete currencies
History of Costa Rica
Currencies of Costa Rica